Biały Dwór may refer to the following places:
Biały Dwór, Greater Poland Voivodeship (west-central Poland)
Biały Dwór, Masovian Voivodeship (east-central Poland)
Biały Dwór, Lidzbark County in Warmian-Masurian Voivodeship (north Poland)
Biały Dwór, West Pomeranian Voivodeship (north-west Poland)